Alessandro is both a masculine Italian given name and a surname.

Alessandro may also refer to:

Alessandro (opera), a 1726 opera by Handel
Alessandro, California, US

People

Alessandro, Signor of Ottajano (1560–1606), Italian patrician
Alessandro, Marquis de Maffei (1662–1730), Italian military officer
Alessandro, 1st Duke of Castel Duino (1881–1937)
Alessandro (footballer, born 1977), Alessandro da Conceição Pinto, Brazilian right-back
Alessandro (footballer, born March 1982), Alessandro Nunes, Brazilian football striker
Alessandro (footballer, born August 1982), Alessandro Viana da Silva, Brazilian left-back
Alessandro (footballer, born 1983) (1983–2005), Alessandro Pinheiro Martins, Brazilian defensive midfielder
Alessandro (footballer, born 1988), Alessandro Felipe Oltramari, Brazilian goalkeeper